Ryūga, Ryuga or Ryuuga (リューガ, リュウガ or りゅうが.) is a masculine Japanese given name.

Possible Writings
Ryūga can be written using different kanji characters and can mean:
隆雅, "noble, elegant"
隆我, "noble, oneself"
竜賀, "dragon, joy"
竜牙, "dragon, fang"
竜雅, "dragon, elegant"
竜我, "dragon, oneself"
流牙, "current, fang"
琉牙, "gem, fang"
龍我, "imperial, oneself"
龍賀, "imperial, joy"
龍牙, "imperial, fang"
龍雅, "imperial, elegant"
The name can also be written in hiragana or katakana.

People with the name
, Japanese footballer

Fictional characters
Ryuga Hideki, an alias used by L in the manga series Death Note
Kamen Rider Ryuga, a character in a television series
, a character from the TV series Garo
, a character in Demonbane
, one of the other main characters in Fist of the North Star
Ryuga, character in Beyblade: Metal Fusion, Beyblade: Metal Masters and Beyblade: Metal Fury
Banjou Ryuuga, a major character and Kamen Rider Cross-Z in Kamen Rider Build

See also
Ryūga Caves, one of the National Historic Sites in Japan

Japanese masculine given names